Euljiro 1(il)-ga Station (을지로입구역) is a station on the Seoul Subway Line 2. The station is located on the north end of the Myeongdong shopping district and is the station closest to the main branch of the Lotte Department Store.

Station layout

References

External links
Walkthrough video of Euljiro 1-ga Station (YouTube.com)

Metro stations in Jung District, Seoul
Seoul Metropolitan Subway stations
Railway stations opened in 1983
1983 establishments in South Korea
20th-century architecture in South Korea